The second generation of the BMW 1 Series consists of the BMW F20 (5-door hatchback) and BMW F21 (3-door hatchback) subcompact cars. The F20/F21 generation was produced by BMW from 2011 to 2019 and is often collectively referred to as the F20.

For the second generation of 1 Series, the coupé and convertible models marketed separately using the new BMW 2 Series nameplate.

The F20/F21 was initially powered by inline-four petrol, inline-four diesel and inline-six petrol engines. In 2015, inline-three petrol and diesel engines were added to the model range. All engines are turbocharged.

Unlike most hatchback competitors, the F20/F21 uses a rear-wheel drive (rather than front-wheel drive) for most models. The F20/F21 is the first 1 Series to offer an optional all-wheel drive (called "xDrive" by BMW).

In July 2019, the BMW 1 Series (F40) began production as the successor to the F20.

Equipment 

Available equipment includes satellite navigation with an 8.8-inch screen, iDrive, LED headlights and digital radio.

The interior and exterior trim is either Sport Line, Urban Line or M Sport. These trim packages differ by alloy wheels, kidney grille, FDS, and other appearance-related features.

In November 2015, the optional Automatic parking (called "Parking Assistant", where the car steers itself to parallel park) was upgraded.

114-125 models with the M Sport trim and M Performance models can be fitted with M Performance Parts. These include black kidney grilles, sport brakes for 18 inch and higher wheels, side skirt ground effects, carbon fibre mirrors and an M Performance silencer system for the M135i and M140i.

Body styles

5-door hatchback (F20) 
The F20 five-door hatchback was the first of the F20/F21 body styles to be released. It was unveiled in 2011 at the Frankfurt Motor Show and then the Auto Guangzhou motor show.

Early models included the 116i, 118i, 116d, 118d, 120d. In 2012, the 125i, 125d and 116d EfficientDynamics Edition models were introduced. In July 2012, the 114i and M135i were introduced, followed by optional all-wheel drive (xDrive) for the 120d and M135i models. After the introduction of the facelift (LCI) models in 2015, the M140i replaced the M135i, which upgraded the engine to the BMW B58 and included various cosmetic changes.

3-door hatchback (F21) 
The vehicle was unveiled at the Auto Mobil International Leipzig 2012. The exterior styling was overseen by Nicolas Huet.

The launch models consisted of the petrol-engined 114i, 116i, 125i and M135i models, and the diesel-engined 114d, 116d, 116d EfficientDynamics Edition, 118d and 125d models. The inline-six M135i model was unveiled in the 3-door body style at the 2012 Geneva International Motor Show. From 2016, the M140i replaced the M135i, with same engine and options as F20.

Engines

Petrol 
Official specifications are as follows:

Diesel 
Official specifications are as follows:

Transmissions 
Available transmission were:
 6-speed manual (Getrag GS6-17 in most models, ZF GS6-45BZ in M135i/M140i)
 8-speed ZF 8HP automatic.

Suspension 
Like its E87 predecessor, the F20/F21 uses aluminum multi-link suspension.

Model year changes

2015 facelift 

The facelift ("LCI", "F20N") changes were unveiled at the 2015 Geneva International Motor Show on 5 March, and began production later that month. Changes included:
 Revised bumpers, tail-lights and LED directional headlights ("Adaptive Headlights")
 Diesel engines changed from 4-cylinder N47 to 3-cylinder BMW B37 (116d model) and 4-cylinder BMW B47 (118d, 120d and 125d models).
 116i and 118i models changed from 4-cylinder N13 engine to 3-cylinder B38.
 120i model introduced, powered by the 4-cylinder N13 engine.
 M135i power increase of

2016 
 M140i model replaces the M135i, powered by the 6-cylinder B58 engine.
 120i model changed from 4-cylinder N13 engine to 4-cylinder B48.
 125i model changed from 4-cylinder N20 engine to 4-cylinder B48.

2017 
 Revised dashboard design and instrument cluster.
 iDrive upgraded to version 6.0.

Motorsport 
The F20 has seen use in the British Touring Car Championship, with the BTCC BMW 125i M Sport entry winning the Constructors' Championship and Teams’ Championship in 2017.

Production 
The F20/F21 is produced in Leipzig, Germany and Regensburg, Germany. Complete knock-down (CKD) assembly of the F20/F21 is conducted in  Araquari, Brazil; Chennai, India; Kulim, Malaysia (by Inokom); and Rayong, Thailand.

Awards 
In 2011, the F20/F21 1 Series won the Bild am Sonntag magazine Golden Steering Wheel award.

In 2015, the M135i was the Sport Auto magazine winner of best compact car up to €50,000.

In 2017, the M140i was the What Car? magazine winner of best hot hatch over £25,000.

References 

1 Series
Cars introduced in 2011